Holy Cross School is a high school, middle school, and primary school serving grades pre-K through 12 founded in 1849 by the Congregation of Holy Cross in New Orleans, Louisiana. The main founder of the Holy Cross order is Blessed Father Basil Moreau, who was beatified on September 15, 2007. Holy Cross School was originally named St. Isidore's College and was a boarding and day school. Holy Cross School is located in the Roman Catholic Archdiocese of New Orleans.

History
In 1849 the Brothers, Priests and Sisters of Holy Cross arrived in New Orleans after they had established the University of Notre Dame in South Bend, Indiana, and took over an orphanage for the boys and girls who survived a plague. The orphanage, along with the first Ursuline School for Girls (the oldest Catholic School in America), was destroyed to make room for the 1923 Industrial Canal, which experienced levee failures that flooded large parts of New Orleans twice, with Hurricane Betsy in 1965 and Hurricane Katrina in 2005.

In 1871, Holy Cross moved to its historic site, which then was a farm named St. Isidore's farm, on 4950 Dauphine Street, and built a renowned "collegiate-styled campus" and established in 1879 its current school, bordered by the high Mississippi River levee. The area has since become a Federal Historic District known as the Holy Cross Historic District.

First chartered by the State of Louisiana in 1890, the name was changed to Holy Cross in 1895 when the Administration Building was dedicated. A boarding program, which continued until 1973, attracted as many as 150 students annually from across the South as well as from Central and South America.

Prior to 2015 Holy Cross had grades 5–12. The archdiocese began requiring schools to fit one of three grade configurations (PK-7, 8–12, or PK-12) in order to continue affiliation, and Holy Cross needed to change its grade configuration. The school administration decided for the school to become PK-12.

Holy Cross relocation
With Hurricane Katrina, the campus was flooded with waters from the levee failures on the Industrial Canal and levees "over-topped" by storm surge along the Mississippi River Gulf Outlet (MRGO), which destroyed the area in August 2005.  The school relocated to the Gentilly/7th Ward neighborhood of New Orleans at 5500 Paris Avenue, the campuses of the former St. Francis Cabrini Parish and Redeemer-Seton High School. The new location of Holy Cross High School includes a high school, middle school, preschool, elementary school, athletic facilities, and an administration building.

The Advisory Committee of the Laura Bush Foundation for America's Libraries chose Holy Cross to receive a $50,000 grant to purchase books for the school's library. First Lady Laura Bush visited Holy Cross on Thursday, April 19, 2007, to present the 14 grantees in Mississippi and Louisiana, including Holy Cross, with the donation.

The former campus in the Lower Ninth Ward sits abandoned and plans for its renovation have not come to fruition.

Athletics
Holy Cross currently competes in Class 5A of the Louisiana High School Athletic Association.

Holy Cross School fields teams and competitors in many sports. The school currently offers soccer, karate, football, basketball, tennis, baseball, bowling, golf, swimming, wrestling, power lifting, track and field, and cross country.

Athletics history
Holy Cross was the first school in the New Orleans area to field a football team post-Katrina in late September of the 2005 football season.

Championships
Basketball championships
(1) State Championships: 1939

Football championships
(2) State Championships: 1945, 1963

Championship history
The Tigers were the 1939 state basketball champions. They again made the championship game in 1974 but lost to Brother Martin.

Holy Cross has won the Louisiana State Wrestling Championship 25 times. They have also had a total of 207 individual state champions and 192 state runner-up finishes. Twenty-two of those titles were won during the 24-year period of 1945 to 1968; 1951 and 1966 were the only years in this period when the state championship was not won by the Tigers. The latest championship was won in 2009.

Rivals
Holy Cross football vs. Jesuit football is one of the oldest continuous high school rivalry in Louisiana. The first game was played in 1922 (which Jesuit won 52–0). The two teams have played every year since, including twice in 1963 (once in regular season and again for the state crown, which Holy Cross won).

The Tigers have also had a long rivalry with Chalmette High School, owing to Holy Cross' former location in the Lower 9th Ward and its large student population from neighboring St. Bernard Parish. Chalmette and Holy Cross were rivals in the New Orleans Catholic League from 1968 through 1988.

Primary school
In March 2014, Holy Cross School announced that they will open a primary school and become a Pre-K through 12 school. Holy Cross is the only all-boys Catholic school in the Greater New Orleans area to offer a comprehensive Pre-K through 12th grade education. Holy Cross Primary School opened to all grades (Pre-K through 4) in the fall of 2015.

Notable alumni

 Joe Aillet - Hall of Fame football coach at Louisiana Tech
 Roland Barbay - former NFL tackle
 Tony Bouie - former NFL safety
 Sam Butera - Musician/Saxophone player
 Leroy Chollet - former NBA player 
 Peter Fos - President, University of New Orleans (2012-2016)
 Ray Garofalo - Louisiana state representative from St. Bernard Parish
 Joe Heap - Academic All American, University of Notre Dame, former NFL running back
 Ray Hester - former NFL linebacker
 Billy Kennedy - basketball head coach, Texas A&M
 John Larroquette - film, stage, and Emmy Award-winning television actor
 Hank Lauricella - college football legend, real estate mogul, and member of both houses of Louisiana State Legislature from Jefferson Parish from 1964 to 1996
 Santiago Rodriguez - Van Cliburn Silver Medalist, Concert Pianist
 Chris Thompson - Canadian Football League's Edmonton Eskimos defensive back
 Billy Truax - former NFL tight end
 Dalton Truax - former NFL offensive tackle
 Len Yochim - former MLB player (Pittsburgh Pirates)
 Ray Yochim - former MLB player (St. Louis Cardinals)

Resources

 Homecoming Isn't a Game This Season by Jere Longman
 In Tale of Church vs. School, a New Orleans Dilemma
 Our Founder

Notes and references

External links
 Holy Cross School Website
 Holy Cross football vs. Jesuit football

Catholic elementary schools in Louisiana
Private K-12 schools in New Orleans
Catholic secondary schools in New Orleans
Lower 9th Ward, New Orleans
Boys' schools in Louisiana
Holy Cross secondary schools
Educational institutions established in 1849
1849 establishments in Louisiana